Artemisia borealis is an arctic and alpine species of plant in the sunflower family, commonly known as northern wormwood, boreal sage, boreal wormwood or boreal sagewort. It is native to high latitudes and high elevations in Eurasia and North America. In North America, it can be found in Alaska, Greenland, the Canadian Arctic, and the Rockies, Cascades, and Sierra Nevada as far south as Arizona and New Mexico. In Eurasia, it is widespread across European and Asiatic Russia and also grows in Scandinavia and in the mountains of central Europe (Carpathians, Alps, etc.)

Description
Perennials, (6–)8–20(–40) cm (caespitose), mildly aromatic; taprooted, caudices branched. Stems (1–)2–5, gray-green, tomentose. Leaves persistent, basal rosettes persistent, gray-green to white; blades ovate, 2–4 × 0.5–1 cm, 2–3-pinnately or -ternately lobed, lobes linear to narrowly oblong, apices acute, faces moderately to densely sericeous. Heads (proximal sessile, distal pedunculate) in (leafy) spiciform arrays 4–9(–12) × (0.5–)1–5 cm. Involucres hemispheric, 3–4 × 3.5–4 mm. Phyllaries (obscurely scarious) densely tomentose-villous. Florets: pistillate 8–10; functionally staminate 15–30; corollas (or lobes) yellow-orange or deep red, 2.2–3.5. Cypselae oblong-lanceoloid, somewhat compressed, faintly nerved, glabrous.

References

borealis
Flora of North America
Flora of Europe
Plants described in 1776
Flora of Asia